The Marine Commandos, abbreviated to MARCOS and officially called the Marine Commando Force (MCF), are a special forces unit of the Indian Navy. Originally, MARCOS was named Indian Marine Special Force, which was later changed to Marine Commando Force to impart "an element of individuality" to it, according to the Indian Navy. The abbreviation 'MARCOS' was coined afterwards.

The MARCOS were founded in February 1987. MARCOS are capable of operating in all types of environments; at sea, in air and on land. The force has gradually acquired more experience and an international reputation for professionalism. The MARCOS regularly undertake specialised maritime operations in Jammu and Kashmir through the Jhelum River and Wular Lake, a  freshwater lake, and conduct counter-insurgency operations in the region.

Some MARCOS units are a part of the tri-services Armed Forces Special Operations Division.

History

In 1955, the Indian military established a diving school at Cochin with the assistance of the British Special Boat Service and began teaching combat divers skills such as explosive disposal, clearance, and salvage diving. The combat divers failed to achieve their desired outcomes during the Indo-Pakistani War of 1971 as they were not adequately trained for sabotage missions. The combat divers had also taught basic underwater demolition training to insurgents from Bangladesh, who were then sent on missions during the war but did not cause any substantial damage to Pakistani military installations. Subsequently, during the war, the Indian Navy assisted the Indian Army in landing operations against the Pakistani military base in Cox's Bazar. After the war ended, army units were often drafted into amphibious exercises. In 1983, the Indian Army formation called 340th Army Independent Brigade was converted into an amphibious assault unit and a series of joint airborne-amphibious exercises were conducted in later years.

In April 1986, the Indian Navy started planning for the creation of a special forces unit that would be capable of undertaking missions in a maritime environment, conducting raids and reconnaissance, and counter-terrorism operations. Three volunteer officers from the diving unit, which was created in 1955, were selected and underwent training courses with the United States Navy SEALs at Coronado. They later went on training exchanges with the Special Boat Service. In February 1987, the Indian Marine Special Force (IMSF) officially came into existence and the three officers were its first members. The IMSF was renamed as 'Marine Commando Force' in 1991.

Known activities and operations
The MARCOS are capable of undertaking operations in all types of terrain but are specialised in maritime operations. The force has undertaken numerous joint exercises with special forces from around the world. , the MARCOS has about 2,000 personnel though the exact number remains classified. Operations undertaken by MARCOS usually remain classified; some of the known operations are:

Organization

Operational responsibilities 

As a specialised force, the MARCOS is responsible for conducting operations at the strategic and the tactical level. MARCO operations are usually conducted in support of naval forces, although MARCOS are also deployed in other domains. The responsibilities of MARCOS has evolved with time. Some of the duties of MARCOS include:-

 Providing support to amphibious operations.
 Special surveillance and amphibious reconnaissance operations.
 Clandestine operations inside hostile territory, including diving operations and special raids.
 Direct action
 Hostage rescue operations.
 Counter-terrorism operations.
 Asymmetric warfare.
 Foreign internal defence.
Additionally, MARCOS can also assist the Indian Air Force in Suppression of Enemy Air Defences (SEAD) missions.

Bases

The MCF currently operates out of the naval bases at Mumbai, Visakhapatnam, Goa, Kochi and Port Blair. There are plans to shift the current training facility at the Naval Special Warfare Training and Tactical Centre to a new facility to be set up at the erstwhile Naval Academy in Goa.

INS Abhimanyu, located in Mumbai, was the base where MARCOS was formed. It is named after Abhimanyu, a character from the epic Mahābhārata. The base is a part of the Western Naval Command. It was originally created in 1974 and was commissioned on 1 May 1980. The Indian Marine Special Force (IMSF) was located there in 1987.
On 12 July 2016, the naval base INS Karna was commissioned near Visakhapatnam as the garrison 
& permanent base for the unit.

Selection and training

All MARCOS personnel are selected from the Indian Navy when they are in their early 20s and have to go through a stringent selection process and training. The selection standards are extremely high. Training is a continuous process. American and British special forces assisted in setting up the initial training program, which now consists of a seven and a half to eight months course for new recruits. The training regimen includes airborne operations, combat diving courses, counter-terrorism, anti-hijacking, anti-piracy operations, direct action, infiltration and exfiltration tactics, special reconnaissance and unconventional warfare. Most of the training is conducted at INS Abhimanyu, which is also the home base of MARCOS.

All MARCOS personnel are freefall qualified (HALO/HAHO). A few also qualify to operate the Cosmos CE-2F/X100 two-man submarines. MARCOS train with the Special Forces officers of the Indian Army the Para SF at the Indian Special Forces Training School, Nahan and Army's other schools for unconventional warfare. These include the Junior Leaders' Commando Training Camp in Belgaum, Karnataka, the Parvat Ghatak School for high altitude mountain warfare in Tawang, Arunachal Pradesh, desert warfare school in Rajasthan, the High Altitude Warfare School (HAWS) in Sonamarg, Kashmir, and the Counter-insurgency and Jungle Warfare School (CIJWS) in Vairengte, Mizoram. These schools routinely host students from other countries. MARCOS are then trained at agencies within the navy.

The pre-training selection process is made up of two parts. Indian Navy personnel who want to join MARCOS must undergo a three-day physical fitness and aptitude test. Within this process, 80% of the applicants are screened out. A further screening process known as 'hell's week' is similar to the United States Navy SEALs' "Hell Week". This involves a high degree of physical exercise and sleep deprivation. After this process, actual training begins.
 Around 80-85% of the volunteers who enroll fail to fully qualify as MARCOS.

The total duration of training of MARCOS is between seven to eight months.Recruits receive warfare training through field operations in counter-insurgency and anti-terrorist operations, and are trained to operate in any kind of environment and in situations like hostage rescue, urban combat and piracy. After that, when the trainee is exhausted and sleep-deprived, he must shoot a target away, with a partner standing next to it.

The MARCOS are trained in every kind of weapon and instruments, including knives, crossbows, sniper rifles, handguns, assault rifles, submachine guns and bare hands. Being divers, they can reach hostile shores swimming underwater.

The further training includes:

    Open and closed circuit diving
    Basic commando skills including advanced weapon skills, demolitions, endurance training and martial arts
    Airborne training
    Intelligence training
    Operation of submersible craft
    Offshore operations
    Counter-terrorism operations
    Operations from submarines
    Skydiving
    Various special skills such as language training, insertion methods, etc.
    Explosive ordnance disposal techniques

They are also trained to parachute into open water with full combat load. In 2013, the MARCOS introduced a larger duck-drop system that will be fitted on Ilyushin Il-76 aircraft. Each system of two boats can accommodate 32 commandos, their weapons and fuel for the boats. Once para-dropped from the aircraft, it allows for the commandos to assemble inflatable motorised boats within ten minutes and quickly reach ships in distress. Such rescue missions can be mounted by the commandos deployed within an hour.

The MARCOS are also preparing for urban warfare and have begun practicing on 3D virtual models of offshore installations to ensure a swift response during a terrorist attack. The marine commandos undergo regular training sessions in this computer-generated programme to be well-prepared for a strike similar to the 26/11 attack.

The average MARCOS training drop-out rate is more than 80%. The force has its own training facility as an adjunct to the operational company at INS Abhimanyu, Mumbai, later as the Naval Special Warfare Tactical Training Centre. For combat diving training, the commandos are sent to the Naval Diving School in Kochi. There are plans to move the Naval Special Warfare Tactical Training Centre to the erstwhile Naval Academy facility in Kerala, where it will focus on jungle warfare and counter-insurgency operations. The new facility will be modelled on the lines of CIJWS of the Indian Army in Mizoram.

Future plans

Integrated Combat System 

To strengthen the capabilities of MARCOS to carry out special operations, the Indian Navy will procure an advanced Integrated Combat System (ICS) that will ensure an effective command, control and information-sharing structure to enhance the MARCOS' capabilities while engaging targets.

The ICS will provide enhanced capabilities such as tactical awareness and the ability to fight in hostile environments, and can enable Group Commanders to remotely monitor and control operations. It will help integrate an individual sailor's capability of surveillance, ballistic protection, communication and firepower through an integrated network at individual and group level. Initiating the procurement process through a Request for Information (RFI), Navy's Directorate of Special Operations and Diving has sought details from global vendors about the ICS.

The individual ICS equipment required by the Navy includes lightweight helmets, head-mounted displays, tactical and soft ballistic vests along with communication equipment. The group-level gear requirements include command and control and surveillance systems, and high-speed communication equipment. The devices would have a sight for the sniper, a laser rangefinder and a long-range thermal imager and near-IR laser pointer for a combat group to undertake surveillance, reconnaissance and targeting. The ICS would be compatible with assault rifles and close-quarter combat weapons. The Navy has recently started acquiring the Israeli IMI Tavor TAR-21 for the MARCOS.

Midget submarines 
In 2013, Vizag-based Hindustan Shipyards Ltd won the contract for building four 500-tonne mini-submarines, which were designed by Larsen & Toubro. The mini-submarines, to be delivered in the latter half of the 2010s, will be used exclusively by the Indian Navy's MARCOS.

Equipment

Firearms

Pistol
 Pistol Auto 9mm 1A 9mm Semi-automatic Pistol
 Beretta 92FS 9mm Semi-automatic Pistol
Glock 9mm Semi-automatic Pistol
IWI Masada 9mm Semi-automatic Pistol
IWI Jericho 941 9mm Semi-automtic Pistol
Sub-machine Gun
 Heckler & Koch MP5 9mm Sub-machine Gun
 Uzi 9mm Sub-machine Gun 
 MP-9 9mm Sub-machine Gun
Assault Rifle
 AK-103 7.62×39mm Assault Rifle
 IWI Tavor 5.56mm Assault Rifle Series
 IWI Tavor X95 5.56mm Carbine
 M4 carbine 5.56mm Assault Rifle
 APS amphibious rifle 5.66×39mm Underwater Assault Rifle
Sniper Rifle
SAKO Tikka T3 TAC 7.62mm Bolt-action Sniper Rifle
IMI Galil 7.62 Sniper/Galatz 7.62mm Semi-automatic Sniper Rifle
OSV-96 Anti-material Rifle.
 Heckler & Koch PSG1 7.62mm Semi-automatic Rifle
 SVDS 7.62x54 mmR Semi-Automatic DMR 
 VSK-94 9×39mm Suppressed Sniper Rifle
VSS Vintorez 9×39mm Suppressed Sniper Rifle
Light Machine Gun
IWI Negev NG-7 7.62×51 mm Light Machine Gun.
 IMI Negev SF 5.56×45mm Light Machine Gun
 MG 2A1 7.62×51 mm General Purpose Machine Gun

Support weapons

 GP-25 40mm Under-barrel grenade launcher
 Arsenal UBGL 40×46mm Under-barrel grenade launcher
 AGS-17 30×29mm Automatic grenade launcher
 RCL Mk III 84mm Recoilless rifle
 Shipon Anti-tank weapon
 9K38 Igla MANPADS

Transport

 HAL Dhruv Utility Helicopter
 Westland WS-61 Sea King Transport Helicopter
 Chetak helicopters
 Cosmos CE-2F X100 two-man Swimmer Delivery Vehicle
 All-terrain vehicles (ATVs)
 Indian Navy Swimmer Delivery Vehicle

See also
 Special Forces of India
 List of military special forces units

References

External links

1987 establishments in India
Military counterterrorist organizations
Special forces of India
Indian Navy
Units of the Indian Peace Keeping Force
Military units and formations established in 1987
India